Cindy Cashdollar is an American musician specializing in steel guitar and Dobro.  She grew up in Woodstock, New York, where she perfected her skills by playing with bluegrass musician John Herald, blues musicians Paul Butterfield, and Levon Helm and Rick Danko of The Band. After residing in Austin, Texas, for 23 years, she has now returned to her native Woodstock, New York.

Cashdollar received five Grammy awards while playing for eight years with Asleep at the Wheel, and has also backed such noted performers as Bob Dylan, Leon Redbone, Redd Volkaert, Carla Olson and Ryan Adams as a member of his band The Cardinals.  In August 2019, Cashdollar recorded dobro and lap steel on "Save Your Love For Me", the new Grayson Hugh record. In 2003, the Academy of Western Artists recognized Cashdollar as Instrumentalist of the Year Award in the Western Swing Music genre. She was inducted into The Austin Chronicle Hall of Fame in 2011–12.

She authored a series of instructional videos on her instruments and released her first solo album, Slide Show, in 2004.  
During the fall of 2004 she was a member of Ryan Adams's band The Cardinals playing the steel guitar live on stage. She also went into the studio with this band and played on the album Cold Roses, although she did not tour the album with Adams & The Cardinals and was replaced in 2005 by Jon Graboff.

From 2005 to 2008, Cashdollar played with Elana James, Redd Volkaert (and, sometimes, Nate Rowe), as The High Flyers, appearing on A Prairie Home Companion twice, as well as playing Austin area venues.

In 2006, she toured with Van Morrison promoting his country and western album, Pay the Devil. She appeared with him at the Austin City Limits Music Festival, on September 15, 2006 (subsequently released on Van Morrison's Live at Austin City Limits Festival limited edition recording), and on the television show Austin City Limits featuring Van Morrison, broadcast in November 2006. Cashdollar plays steel guitar on two of the tracks on Morrison's March 2008 studio album, Keep It Simple. She is an eponymous member of Dave Alvin's 2009 project, Dave Alvin and the Guilty Women.

Discography

Awards and nominations

References

External links
Official Cindy Cashdollar Website

American bluegrass guitarists
American blues guitarists
Living people
Steel guitarists
1956 births
The Cardinals (rock band) members
People from Woodstock, New York
Asleep at the Wheel members
20th-century American guitarists
20th-century American women guitarists
21st-century American women